San Michele dei Leprosetti is a Greek-Catholic church serving the Ukrainian community in Bologna, Italy. It is situated on the piazza of the same name (formerly Piazza Asinara, then Piazza Brusato) in the Quartiere San Vitale district. Records indicate that the original church burned down in 1210 and was rebuilt in 1361.
It was consecrated to the Ukrainian Greek Catholic Church in November 2009.

It contains a fresco of Madonna and child by Vitale da Bologna.

See also
 Roman Catholic Archdiocese of Bologna

References

Churches in the province of Bologna
14th-century Roman Catholic church buildings in Italy
Ukrainian Catholic churches in Italy